Suresh Gopi (born 26 June 1958) is an Indian actor, politician, playback singer and television presenter. He works predominantly in Malayalam cinema and has also appeared in some Tamil, Telugu, Kannada and Bollywood films. Suresh made his acting debut as a child in the 1965 film Odayil Ninnu. He made his debut as an adult in 1986 and since then, he has acted in more than 250 films. Suresh Gopi is a recipient of the National Film Award and the Kerala State Film Award in 1998 for his performance in Kaliyattam. He was a nominated member of the Rajya Sabha, the upper house of the Parliament of India.

Early life & education
Suresh Gopi was born on 26 June 1958 in Kollam, Kerala, India to K. Gopinathan Pillai, a film distributor, and V. Gnanalekshmi Amma, as their eldest son. He has three younger brothers—Subhash Gopi, Sunil Gopi and Sanil Gopi (the latter two are twins). He was brought up in Kollam. 

Gopi was educated at the Infant Jesus Anglo-Indian School in Kollam. He then joined the Fatima Mata National College in Kollam for his higher studies. He holds a Bachelor of Science degree in Zoology and Master of Arts degree in English literature.

Career

1986–92: Early years 
Suresh Gopi made his debut as a child artist in 1965 by playing a small role in Odayil Ninnu. Later he made his debut as an adult in 1986 with an uncredited role in Niramulla Raavukal. He gained attention through the minor role of a prospective groom in T. P. Balagopalan M. A. (1986). Suresh Gopi went on to play few antagonistic and numerous supporting roles throughout the late 1980s and early 1990s. He was noted for his villain role in Irupatham Noottandu (1987). It was the highest grossing Malayalam movie of that time. He had a major supporting role as Harry in Oru CBI Diary Kurippu (1988), which was also the highest grossing film at the time. Gopi's comic role as Sub Inspector Minnal Prathapan in Manu Uncle (1988) has over the years attained a cult status. His portrayal of Dr. Narendran in Padmarajan's 1990 film Innale (1990) was critically acclaimed and is considered by fans and critics to be one of the best performances of his career. Gopi also gained lot of appraisal for his portrayal of Aromal Chekavar in 1989 classic Oru Vadakkan Veeragatha. He played another memorable cameo comic role as Christopher Luke, a professional killer in Nagarangalil Chennu Raparkam (1989). His other notable movies during the late 1980s include Bhoomiyile Rajakkanmar, New Delhi (1987), Moonnam Mura, 1921 (1988), Varnam, Douthyam, Nair Saab (1989). His notable films during the early 1990s includes In Harihar Nagar and Thoovalsparsham both released in 1990.

1992–95: Breakthrough and establishment as a superstar

After acting in more than 80 movies, Suresh Gopi finally got a breakthrough by playing the lead role in Shaji Kailas's Thalastaanam (1992), which was written by Renji Panicker. Suresh Gopi established himself as a lead actor in Malayalam cinema through Ekalavyan (1993). This crime thriller was also written by Renji Panicker and directed by Shaji Kailas. Ekalavyan broke many records at the box office and successfully completed 150 days in theaters. Shaji-Renji combination films turned Suresh Gopi into an overnight star in 1990s especially through police and army roles. In 1993 itself, he played the lead role in Mafia, another Shaji-Renji crime thriller which was very successful at box office. The same year, he played the role of Nakulan alongside Mohanlal and Shobhana in Fazil's psychological thriller Manichitrathazhu, which is considered one of the best Malayalam movies ever made. He played the role of a NSG commando in Kashmeeram (1994) which was a commercial hit. It is probably the film Commissioner (1994), which helped Suresh Gopi to gain a super-star status in Malayalam Cinema. He played the role of Bharath Chandran I.P.S in this another Shaji-Renji crime thriller, which is treated as a cult classic film. He played the role of a RAW officer in Highway (1995) which ran for more than 100 days in theatres.

1996–2005: Further commercial successes

Suresh Gopi's high budget film Yuvathurki (1996) failed to create expected results at box office. The same year, he appeared in a different avatar by playing the role of a wildlife photographer in Rajaputran. It became one of the highest grossing Malayalam movies in 1996.

One of his popular and career best character Anakkattil Chackochi came out through Lelam in 1997. Scripted by Renji panicker and directed by Joshiy, it was one of the highest-grossing movies of the year. The role of Kannan Perumalayan in Jayaraj's Kaliyattam (1997) won him the National Film Award for Best Actor and the Kerala State Film Award for Best Actor. His other notable movies in 1997 were Janathipathyam and Guru. In Guru, he played a supporting role. Suresh Gopi's played a lead role alongside Jayaram in the comedy drama Summer in Bethlehem (1998). He played the character Dennis and received wide appreciation from the critics. It was also the third highest-grossing movie in 1998. His other notable movies in 1998 were Thalolam and Pranayavarnangal.

Suresh Gopi's action thriller film Pathram (1999) directed by Joshiy was the highest grossing Malayalam movie in 1999. The film, which ran over 275 days in theatres is also considered by many fans to be one of the best in his career. The same year he starred in another Joshiy action thriller Vazhunnor which was also a commercial hit. In 1999, two of his popular crime investigation thrillers Crime File and F. I. R came out. Both films were commercially successful.

In 2000, Suresh Gopi starred in Mark Antony and Cover Story, an action film and a crime thriller. He played a lead role, with comic elements, in the comedy drama Thenkashippattanam (2000) alongside Lal. The film was one of the highest grossers at the box office and ran for more than 275 days in theatres. Suresh Gopi played the lead role in Rajasenan's horror film Meghasandesham (2001). His other notable movies in 2001 are the comedy drama Sundara Purushan and investigation thriller Nariman. In 2003, he appeared in a lead role alongside Kunchako Boban in Rajasenan's family drama Swapnam Kondu Thulabharam. In 2005, he did the lead role in Renji Panicker's Bharathchandran I.P.S, a sequel to the 1994 film Commissioner. The film was a major hit at the box office. His performance is Makalkku (2005) was critically acclaimed.

2006–2015: Decline and hiatus

Suresh Gopi's fanbase slowly started to diminish during the mid-2000s with many of his movies released in 2006 becoming a failure at the box office. This includes films such as Lanka, Rashtram, Pathaaka, Ashwaroodan, Bada Dosth and Smart City. However, his legal thriller Chinthamani Kolacase directed by Shaji Kailas was a blockbuster at the box office in 2006. Suresh Gopi played the lead role of a psychotic lawyer, who enforces the law in his style.

Most of his movies released after Chinthamani Kolacase were failures at the box office. It includes movies such as Detective, Paranju Theeratha Visheshangal, Black Cat Kichamani MBA and Time all of which released in 2007. The same year he had a special appearance in the science fiction film Bharathan Effect. His only commercially successful film in 2007 was the crime investigation thriller Nadiya Kollappetta Rathri. In 2008, Suresh Gopi did a lead role in the multi-starrer blockbuster Twenty:20. In 2009, he was praised for his role as Ramesh Menon in the anthology film Kerala Cafe in the segment Lalitham Hiranmayam.

In 2010, he played the role of a father seeking revenge upon those who raped his daughter in Janakan which earned him appreciation. In 2011, he appeared in the multi-starrer film Christian Brothers. The same year, Suresh Gopi acted in the film Melvilasom which received wide critical acclaim upon its release. Suresh Gopi reunited with Shaji Kailas and Renji Panicker in 2012 through The King & the Commissioner. In the film, which is a crossover of Commissioner (1994) and The King (1995), Suresh Gopi reprised his role as Bharathchandran I.P.S along with Mammooty reprising his role as Joseph Alex from The King. The film, mostly panned by the critics was commercially successful. He was praised for his role as Dr. Vijay Nambiar in Apothecary (2014). He was nominated for the Best Actor award at the Filmfare Awards South for his performance in the movie. Suresh Gopi played the villain role in the Tamil film action thriller film I (2015). His role as Dr. Vasudevan in the movie was acclaimed. My God (2015) was his last film before going to a 4-year hiatus from acting.

2020–present: Return after hiatus 

In March 2019, he made a comeback announcement in acting by joining Vijay Antony starrer Tamil film Thamilarasan. The film is expected to release in late 2021 after getting delayed due to COVID-19 pandemic in India. Suresh Gopi made his comeback in Malayalam cinema by playing a pivotal role in Varane Avashyamund in 2020, after a five year long hiatus. The movie also saw the reunion of Suresh Gopi and Shobana after a span of 15 years. The movie was a major success at box office and was critically acclaimed. In June 2020, Tomichan Mulakuppadam announced to produce Suresh Gopi's 250th movie. The film titled as Ottakkomban would see Suresh Gopi playing the role of Kuruvachan. On 14 February 2021, Suresh Gopi announced that he will be reuniting with director Joshiy for the film titled Paappan. His other upcoming movie is Kaaval, an action thriller directed by Nithin Renji Panicker which would also feature Renji Panicker playing a pivotal role.

Television host
In 2012, he hosted the game show Ningalkkum Aakaam Kodeeshwaran on Asianet, which was the Malayalam version of Who Wants to Be a Millionaire?. He continued to host it four more seasons.

Politics
During his college days, Suresh was an active member of the Students' Federation of India (SFI), the students' wing of the Communist Party of India (Marxist) (CPIM). Later in his life, he developed an admiration for stateswoman Indira Gandhi and the Indian National Congress (INC). In the 2006 Kerala Legislative Assembly election, he campaigned for both Left Democratic Front (LDF) and United Democratic Front candidates. He campaigned for LDF candidate V. S. Achuthanandan in Malampuzha constituency and UDF candidate M. P. Gangadharan in Ponnani constituency.

On 29 April 2016, Suresh Gopi was sworn in as a Member of Parliament (MP) in the Rajya Sabha, nominated by the President of India in the category of eminent citizens as per the provisions of Article 80 of the Constitution of India. He opted Thiruvananthapuram district as the nodal district of operation under the Members of Parliament Local Area Development Scheme. In May 2016, he was enlisted as a member in the standing committee for Information Technology and in the Consultative Committee for the Ministry of Civil Aviation (India). In October 2016, Suresh officially joined the Bharatiya Janata Party.

He contested in the 2019 Indian general election in Kerala as a candidate of BJP in Thrissur constituency. During the election campaign he invoked the name of the Sabarimala deity Ayyappan and hence District Collector of Thrissur, T. V. Anupama issued notice to actor and report to the CEO of Kerala, Teeka Ram Meena. Meena found that Mr.Gopi has violated the model of conduct (MCC). He lost in this election to the Congress candidate T.N. Prathapan and secured third position behind the CPI candidate Rajaji Mathew Thomas who came second.

During the 2020 Kerala local body elections, Gopi advised the local BJP representatives about his stance on accepting requests from people. He said that people from all over Kerala write to him about different requests, and he only accepts the letters of request from individuals if they are attached to letters of recommendation from BJP district party chiefs. This was described by Gopi as a move that would strengthen the party. This controversial statement was shared widely on social media.

Personal life
On 8 February 1990, Suresh married Radhika Nair, the granddaughter of actress Aranmula Ponnamma. They have five children—Lakshmi Suresh, Gokul Suresh, Bhagya Suresh, Bhavni Suresh, and Madhav Suresh. Lakshmi died in a car accident while she was one-and-a-half years old. Gokul Suresh is a young actor in Malayalam cinema. Suresh resides with family in Sasthamangalam, Thiruvananthapuram.

Gopi made headlines in 2015, when he gave his support to Maharashtra's controversial ban on beef while he was talking to the media. He said he never tasted beef in his life, and he never cooked it in his home and nobody in his home eats beef. He also added that if such a ban comes to the state, he would obey the government. However, a new video appeared online which captured Gopi, conversing on a radio show and speaking about his weight gain after a latest trip to Zurich. He shared how he had eaten beef continuously for 4 days when there was only pork and beef available, which led him to gain weight.

Controversy 
In December 2017, The Kerala state police arrested Suresh Gopi on charges of forging documents to register his luxury vehicle. The state police alleged that Gopi had used fraudulent home address to register his luxury vehicles in Pondicherry to escape the 20% vehicle-tax in Kerala on cars costing over ₹20 lakh. In January 2020, the Crime branch reported that Gopi had registered his two Audi cars at a price of ₹60 lakh and ₹80 lakh each and evaded paying a tax of ₹3.6 lakh and ₹16 lakh for each of the cars. He was later released on anticipatory bail.

Awards and nominations

National Film Awards
1998: Best Actor – Kaliyattam

Kerala State Film Awards
1998: Best Actor –  Kaliyattam

Filmfare Awards South
 2014: Nominated – Best Actor – Apothecary
 2016: Nominated - Best Actor in a Negative Role- I

See also
Gokul Suresh
Suresh Gopi filmography

Notes

References

External links
 
 
 
 

Living people
1959 births
20th-century Indian male actors
21st-century Indian male actors
Indian actor-politicians
Best Actor National Film Award winners
Indian male child actors
Kerala State Film Award winners
Male actors from Kollam
Male actors in Malayalam cinema
Indian male film actors
Nominated members of the Rajya Sabha
Bharatiya Janata Party politicians from Kerala
Rajya Sabha members from the Bharatiya Janata Party